Enteremna pallida is a moth in the family Depressariidae. It was described by Turner in 1939. It is found in Australia, where it has been recorded from Western Australia.

References

Moths described in 1939
Depressariinae